Sob Charitro Kalponik, ("All Characters are Imaginary," also known as Afterword) is a 2009 Bengali film by Rituparno Ghosh starring Bipasha Basu, Prosenjit Chatterjee and Jisshu Sengupta. It was selected for the 30th Durban International Film Festival and won National Film Award for Best Feature Film in Bengali 2009. It was screened in the Marché du Film section of the 2009 Cannes Film Festival.

Plot
Non-resident Bengali Radhika (Bipasha Basu) marries the thespian poet Indranil Mitra (Prosenjit Chatterjee) to settle in Kolkata. While Indranil continues his surveillance of the surreal world of words, rhythms, rhymes, and imaginations Radhika single-handedly pulls out the private and public aspects of conjugal life. Radhika gets wholesome support from their housemaid Priyobala Das (also called Nondor ma). While the apparently irresponsible and introverted Indranil does one menace after other (like quitting his job after getting an award), Radhika stands like a rock to make the family financially sound.

All the reluctance and indifference from Indranil makes Radhika's heart oscillate towards Shekhar, her office colleague and Indranil's biggest admirer. Radhika becomes attracted to Shekhar (Jisshu Sengupta) but cannot abandon the unpredictability and histrionics of her spouse.

Cast
 Prosenjit Chatterjee as Indranil Mitra
 Bipasha Basu as Radhika Mitra
 Jisshu Sengupta as Shekhar
 Paoli Dam as Kajori Roy
 Sohag Sen as Priyobala Das aka Nondor Maa

References

External links

2009 films
Bengali-language Indian films
Films set in Kolkata
Films directed by Rituparno Ghosh
Best Bengali Feature Film National Film Award winners
2000s Bengali-language films
Films scored by Raja Narayan Deb
Reliance Entertainment films